Harry Webster was an English footballer, who played as an inside forward in the Football League for Bolton Wanderers and Chester.

References

1930 births
2008 deaths
Footballers from Sheffield
Association football inside forwards
English footballers
Bolton Wanderers F.C. players
Chester City F.C. players
Chorley F.C. players
English Football League players